The Monthly Anthology and Boston Review was a miscellaneous magazine published by the Anthology Club of Boston, Massachusetts from 1804–1811. The more famous North American Review is generally considered to be its successor.

Oliver Wendell Holmes describes the magazine thus, in his disquisition on Ralph Waldo Emerson: "The Anthology was the literary precursor of the North American Review, and the theological herald of the Christian Examiner. Like all first beginnings it showed many marks of immaturity. It mingled extracts and original contributions, theology and medicine, with all manner of literary chips and shavings. It had Magazine ways that smacked of Sylvanus Urban; leading articles with balanced paragraphs which recalled the marching tramp of Johnson; translations that might have been signed with the name of Creech, and Odes to Sensibility, and the like, which recalled the syrupy sweetness and
languid trickle of Laura Matilda's sentimentalities. It talked about 'the London Reviewers' with a kind of provincial deference. It printed articles with quite too much of the license of Swift and Prior for the Magazines of to-day. But it had opinions of its own, and would compare well enough with The Gentleman's Magazine....""

Publication history
 Monthly Anthology v. 1, 1804 (Boston: Munroe & Francis)
 Monthly Anthology v. 2, 1805 (Boston: Munroe & Francis)
 Monthly Anthology v. 3, 1806 (Boston: Munroe & Francis)
 Monthly Anthology v. 4, 1807 (Boston: Munroe & Francis)
 Monthly Anthology v. 5, 1808 (Boston: Snelling & Simons; and Hastings, Etheridge & Bliss)
 Monthly Anthology v. 6, 1809 (Boston: Hastings, Etheridge & Bliss)
 Monthly Anthology v. 7, 1809 (Boston: T. B. Wait & Co.)
 Monthly Anthology v. 8, 1810 (Boston: T. B. Wait & Co.)
 Monthly Anthology v. 9, 1810 (Boston: T. B. Wait & Co.)
 Monthly Anthology v.10, 1811 (Boston: T. B. Wait & Co.)

Further reading
 
 Peter S. Field. "The Birth of Secular High Culture: "The Monthly Anthology and Boston Review" and Its Critics." Journal of the Early Republic, Vol. 17, No. 4 (Winter, 1997), pp. 575–609

19th century in Boston
1800s in the United States
1804 establishments in the United States
1811 disestablishments in the United States
Cultural history of Boston
Defunct literary magazines published in the United States
Magazines established in 1804
Magazines disestablished in 1811
Magazines published in Boston